West Ayton is a village and civil parish in the Scarborough 
district of North Yorkshire, England. Located upon the west bank of the River Derwent adjacent to East Ayton.

According to the 2011 UK census, West Ayton parish had a population of 881, an increase on the 2001 UK census figure of 831.

The ruins of Ayton castle can be found to the east of the village.  The tower dates back to 1390 and was built by Ralph Eure.  During the 1670s, stone from the castle was used to rebuild the bridge over the River Derwent.

Just south of the village is the Wykeham Lakes park. This is a fishery and water-sports complex run by the Downe family's Dawnay Estates programme. The lakes are built on the site of a former First World War Royal Flying Corps airfield (known as West Ayton) that was used by No. 251 Squadron. The airfield was abandoned after 1919.

References

External links

Villages in North Yorkshire
Civil parishes in North Yorkshire